James Thornton may refer to:

Entertainment
 James Thornton (songwriter) (1861–1938), American songwriter and vaudeville performer
 Jim Thornton (born 1965), American TV and radio announcer
 James Thornton (actor) (born 1975), English actor

Politics and law
 James Innes Thornton (1800–1877), Alabama planter and politician
 James Johnston Thornton (1816–1884), judge, land developer, and quartermaster of the Union Army
 James D. Thornton (1823–1902), California Supreme Court Justice
 James Innes Thornton (1800–1877), Secretary of State of Alabama, 1824–1834
 James Thornton (environmentalist), environmental lawyer and writer

Other
 James Thornton (tight end) (born 1965), American football player
 James Thornton (cricketer) (1861–1916), English cricketer
 James Thornton (naval officer) (1826–1875), officer in the United States Navy during the American Civil War
 James R. Thornton (1853–1911), President of Hampden–Sydney College for two-and-a-half weeks in 1904
 James Worth Thornton (1906–1983), businessman and scion of the Thorntons of Indiana
 James Thornton (health economist) (born 1955), professor of economics at Eastern Michigan University
 James E. Thornton, American computer scientist, winner of the 1994 Eckert–Mauchly Award